The Intelligent Input Bus (IBus, pronounced as I-Bus) is an input method (IM) framework for multilingual input in Unix-like operating-systems. The name "Bus" comes from its bus-like architecture.

Goals
The main goals of the IBus project include:

 Providing full-featured and user-friendly input-method user interfaces
 Employing authentication measures to improve security
 Providing a universal interface and library for input-method developers
 Fitting the need of users from different regions and customs

Motivation
The draft Specification of IM engine Service Provider Interface document from the Northeast Asia OSS Forum Work Group 3 recommends bus-centric IM framework architectures with a bus implementation (similar to dbus). According to the specification, SCIM-1.4 is not considered suitable for further development as it is developed in C++, which usually causes ABI transition problems.

Since then, succeeding projects like IM-BUS (led by James Su) and SCIM-2 (led by Zheng Hu) were started. However, both projects are suspended. Therefore, Huang Peng from Red Hat established the IBus project to prove the idea of IM-BUS by using Python, D-Bus and GLib rather than implementing the functions recommended by CJK OSS forum. In spite of that, IBus has already gained community acceptance, and FreeBSD and many Linux distribution such as Fedora and Ubuntu already have IBus in their package repositories. IBus became the new default input method framework in Fedora 11, and replaced SCIM in Ubuntu 9.10.

Architecture
IBus is developed in C and Python, thus avoiding the C++ ABI transition problem of SCIM <1.4.14.

IBus provides most of its functionality through services. There are three kinds of services:
 Input method engine (IME): Actual input method
 Configuration: Handles the configuration for IBus and other services such as IME
 Panel: User interface such as language bar and candidate selection table

IBus employs D-Bus to communicate among ibus-daemon, services, and IM clients such as terminal emulators, editors and web browsers. ibus-daemon manages all clients and services by receiving registrations from services, and sending D-Bus message to corresponding services and IM client.

It implements XIM protocol, and has GTK and Qt input method modules.

Features
 Engine loading and unloading on demand
 Notification area support on the taskbar
 Interoperability with XKB
 Immediately applies configuration changes
 Provides C and Python bindings

Available input method plugins and engines
 ibus-anthy: A plugin for Anthy, a Japanese IME
 ibus-avro: Phonetic keyboard layout for writing Bengali based on Avro Keyboard
 ibus-cangjie: An engine for the Cangjie input method
 ibus-chewing: An intelligent Chinese Phonetic IME for Zhùyīn users. It is based on libChewing.
 ibus-hangul: A Korean IME
 ibus-libpinyin: A newer Chinese IME for Pinyin users. Designed by Huang Peng and Peng Wu.
ibus-libthai: A Thai IME based on libthai
 ibus-libzhuyin: An engine for the Zhùyīn ("bopomofo") input method (an alternative to ibus-chewing)
 ibus-m17n: A multilingualism IME which allows input of many languages using the input methods from m17n-db. See more details in #ibus-m17n.
 ibus-mozc: A plugin to the Japanese IME "mozc" developed by Google
 ibus-pinyin: An intelligent Chinese Phonetic IME for Hanyu pinyin users. Designed by Huang Peng (main author of IBus) and has many advanced features such as English spell checking.  Deprecated and replaced with ibus-libpinyin (see above)
 ibus-table: An IME that accommodates table-based IMs. See more details in #ibus-table.
 ibus-unikey: An IME for typing Vietnamese characters

ibus-m17n
ibus-m17n is an IME that uses input methods and corresponding icons in the m17n database. Unlike ibus-table which supports plain tables, m17n input methods also support states, whose labels are displayed on the IBus panel (language bar). M17n input methods also support surrounding text, consequently, languages such as Thai and IMs such as plain Zhuyin that require this feature are supported through ibus-m17n, as is pinyin with diacritics for the four tones.

ibus-table
ibus-table, developed by Yu Wei Yu, is an IME that loads tables of input methods which do not need complicated logic to select words. Many structure-based Chinese input methods such as Cangjie and Wubi are supported this way.

Officially released IM tables:
 latex: Input special characters using LaTeX syntax. Included in ibus-table package.
 compose: input special letter by compose letter and diacritical mark. Included in ibus-table package.
 Array30: Array30 Chinese IM tables
 Cangjie: Cangjie 3 and 5 Chinese IM tables
 Erbi: Er-bi Chinese IM table
 Wubi: Wubi Chinese IM table
 Yong: YongMa Chinese IM Table
 ZhengMa: ZhengMa Chinese IM table

See also
 List of input methods for UNIX platforms
 fcitx
 Input method
 m17n
 SCIM
 uim

References

External links
 
 Comparison of Chinese Input Method Servers for Unix-like Operating Systems
 Example for using IBus-Table to create a new IM

Free software programmed in C
Free software programmed in Python
Software that uses GLib